The Tsum Valley is a valley situated in Gorkha district of western Nepal at an altitude of . The valley lies inside the jurisdiction of the Manaslu Conservation Area which was established in 1998. 

The valley has 33 villages with 529 households and the population is 1,810. The lower part of the valley is steep and has less settlement. 
The Tsumba are the indigenous people of the valley.  They practise both Bon and Buddhism.

References

Valleys of Nepal